Ellen L. Weintraub is an American attorney who serves as a Commissioner on the Federal Election Commission.

Career 

Ellen Weintraub began her career in private practice as a litigator with the New York firm of Cahill Gordon & Reindel. Weintraub was then counsel to the Committee on Standards of Official Conduct for the U.S. House of Representatives (the House Ethics Committee), where she advised members on investigations. She focused on implementing the Ethics Reform Act of 1989 and subsequent changes to the House Code of Official Conduct. She also served as editor in chief of the House Ethics Manual and as a principal contributor to the Senate Ethics Manual. Weintraub subsequently returned to private practice as counsel at Perkins Coie LLP, where she was a member of its Political Law Group. There, she counseled clients on federal and state campaign finance laws, political ethics, nonprofit law, and lobbying regulation. During the election contest arising out of the 1996 election of Senator Mary Landrieu (D-LA), Weintraub served on the legal team that advised the Senate Rules Committee.

Weintraub received a recess appointment to the Federal Election Commission on December 6, 2002, and took office on December 9, 2002. She was renominated on January 9, 2003, and confirmed by unanimous consent of the United States Senate on March 18, 2003. Shortly after her arrival at the FEC, Weintraub was elected Chair of the Commission for 2003. She is the third woman to serve on the Commission, following Republicans Lee Ann Elliott and Joan Aikens. In June 2008, two more women, Democrat Cynthia L. Bauerly and Republican Caroline C. Hunter, joined Weintraub on the Commission.

In July 2013, while Weintraub was serving as Chair, the Commission ruled that legally married same-sex couples must be treated the same as opposite-sex couples under election law.

In February 2017, Weintraub called on President Donald Trump to reveal his evidence of voter fraud after the president claimed that it caused him and former Senator Kelly Ayotte to lose in New Hampshire in the 2016 U.S. election. “The scheme the President of the United States alleges would constitute thousands of felony criminal offences under New Hampshire law,” Weintraub said in a statement printed on FEC letterhead. As a result, an organization funded by the Koch brothers, Cause of Action, issued a statement calling for her to be investigated for ethics violations. Weintraub subsequently defended her actions and maintained that the alleged fraud would constitute a violation of federal campaign finance laws, which is germane to her position as a FEC commissioner. After Trump repeated these claims at an August campaign rally in 2019, Weintraub wrote a letter asking Trump to produce evidence of his assertions.

During 2017, Weintraub championed greater disclosure of political ads on the internet, and helped move the FEC to open a rulemaking on the matter with bipartisan support. On December 18, 2018 she was once again elected Chair.

Weintraub's term ended April 30, 2007, but she continues in office until her successor takes office. She is not eligible for reappointment.

Personal life 
Weintraub is married to Bill Dauster (former director of policy for Senator Chris Van Hollen and former legislative director for Senator Russ Feingold). She is a Reform Jew.

See also

Dark Money (film)

References

External links
Federal Election Commission biography

Members of the Federal Election Commission
Harvard Law School alumni
Living people
Recess appointments during the George W. Bush administration
Yale College alumni
American women lawyers
Lawyers from New York City
People from Montgomery County, Maryland
People associated with Cahill Gordon & Reindel
1957 births
People associated with Perkins Coie
21st-century American women